Favonigobius lentiginosus is a species of goby native to the coastal waters of Australia and New Zealand.  This species can reach a length of  TL.

References

lentiginosus
Fish described in 1844